Brigadier Andrew Terence Juxon-Smith (30 November 1931 – 1996) was a Creole politician and military officer in Sierra Leone. Between 27 March 1967 and 18 April 1968, he was Chairman of the National Reformation Council and acting Governor-General, equivalent to head of the Sierra Leonean state. He was additionally Minister of Finance of Sierra Leone. He and the Council were overthrown in April 1968 by a group of low-level military officials led by John Amadu Bangura that restored Sierra Leone to rule by parliament under Siaka Stevens. He later moved to the United States and died in Stapleton, New York.

Juxon-Smith's life is the subject of the short documentary A Forgotten Past, directed by Andreas Hadjipateras in 2018.

References

External links
 History of Sierra Leone

1931 births
1996 deaths
Graduates of the Royal Military Academy Sandhurst
People from Freetown
Sierra Leonean politicians
Sierra Leonean military personnel
Leaders who took power by coup
Governors-General of Sierra Leone
Sierra Leone Creole people
Prime Ministers of Sierra Leone
Finance ministers of Sierra Leone